Bedfordshire (abbreviated Beds) is a ceremonial, non-metropolitan, and historic county in the East of England. It is bordered by Northamptonshire to the north, Cambridgeshire to the north-east and east, Hertfordshire to the south and south-east, and Buckinghamshire to the west. Since Bedfordshire County Council was abolished in 2009, the county has been administered by the three unitary authorities of the Borough of Bedford, Borough of Luton, and Central Bedfordshire. It is the fourteenth most densely populated county of England, with over half the population of the county living in the two largest built-up areas: Luton (258,018) and Bedford (106,940).

History

The first recorded use of the name in 1011 was "Bedanfordscir," meaning the shire or county of Bedford, which itself means "Beda's ford" (river crossing).

Bedfordshire was historically divided into nine hundreds: Barford, Biggleswade, Clifton, Flitt, Manshead, Redbornestoke, Stodden, Willey, Wixamtree, along with the liberty and borough of Bedford.

There have been several changes to the county boundary; for example, in 1897 Kensworth and part of Caddington were transferred from Hertfordshire to Bedfordshire.

Geography
The southern end of the county is on the chalk ridge known as the Chiltern Hills. The remainder forms part of the broad drainage basin of the River Great Ouse and its tributaries. Most of Bedfordshire's rocks are clays and sandstones from the Jurassic and Cretaceous periods, with some limestone. Local clay has been used for brick-making of  Fletton-style bricks in the Marston Vale.  Glacial erosion of chalk has left hard flint nodules deposited as gravel—these have been commercially extracted in the past at pits which are now lakes: at Priory Country Park, Wyboston and  Felmersham. The  Greensand Ridge is an escarpment across the county from near Leighton Buzzard to near Gamlingay in Cambridgeshire.

Climate

Bedfordshire, being situated in the east of England, has a relatively dry climate. While there is little difference from month to month, there are more wet days in autumn and winter but often heavier individual falls in spring and summer; of note were the 1998 Easter floods.

Average temperatures in Bedford range from a low of  overnight in February to a high of  during the day in July. Record temperatures by month for Woburn follow:

Politics

Police and Crime Commissioner

The Bedfordshire Police and Crime Commissioner is Festus Akinbusoye who is a member of the Conservative Party.

Local government

For local government purposes, Bedfordshire is divided into three unitary authorities: the boroughs of Bedford and Luton, and the District of Central Bedfordshire. Healthcare in the county is dealt with by a single Clinical Commission Group (CCG), which serves all three local authorities in the county, alongside the City of Milton Keynes in Buckinghamshire.

Emergency services

Policing and fire and rescue services continue to be provided on a county-wide basis, with Bedfordshire Police governed by the Bedfordshire Police and Crime Commissioner and Bedfordshire Fire and Rescue Service governed by a Fire Authority comprising members of the three councils.

Parliamentary constituencies

For elections to the House of Commons, Bedfordshire is divided into six constituencies, each returning a single Member of Parliament (MP):

The present constituencies date from 1997. The boundaries were slightly modified for the 2010 general election.

Economy
This is a chart of trend of regional gross value added of Bedfordshire at current basic prices published (pp. 240–253) by Office for National Statistics with figures in millions of British Pounds Sterling.

Bedfordshire is the location of a number of notable UK and international companies who have either headquarters or major bases in the county. Autoglass, Boxclever and Charles Wells Pubs are all based in Bedford, while the Kier Group and Kingspan Timber Solutions are based in Sandy, and Jordans Cereals are based in Biggleswade. EasyJet, Impellam, TUI Airways and Vauxhall Motors are all based in Luton, Whitbread is based in Houghton Regis and Costa Coffee is now based in Dunstable. UltraVision is based in Leighton Buzzard, while Moto Hospitality is based at Toddington service station.

Traditional dishes
The "Bedfordshire clanger" is a local dish consisting of a suet crust pastry filled with meat in one end and a fruit preserve in the other. It was traditionally a farm labourers' meal, designed so as to produce no waste as well as two separate meals.

Chocolate Toothpaste is another local delicacy. A chocolate tart, Chocolate Toothpaste consists of a gritty chocolate filling (said to resemble the texture of toothpaste) within a pastry tart, commonly finished with a swirl of whipped cream on top.

Visitor attractions

Transport

Bedfordshire lies on many of the main transport routes which link London to the Midlands, Northern England and the rest of the UK.

Roads
Two of England's six main trunk roads pass through Bedfordshire:
 The A1 London to Edinburgh road (the Great North Road) runs close by Biggleswade and Sandy
  Watling Street, the Roman road between London and Chester, passes through Dunstable. Until it was diverted in 2017, this was also the route of the A5 road between London and Holyhead. The Bedfordshire section of the A5 now runs from junction 11a of the M1 to rejoin Watling Street between Dunstable and Hockliffe, then continues on to cross the Buckinghamshire border at the City of Milton Keynes.

To these was added in 1959 the M1 motorway, running from London to Leeds. Running from junctions 10 to 13 in Bedfordshire, there are two junctions serving Luton (at the southern end), with another one serving Bedford and Milton Keynes (at the northern end). Between these lies two other junctions in the county, with one connecting to the A5 and serving Dunstable, and the other serving the town of Flitwick. There is also one motorway service station in the county: Toddington Services.

Former trunk roads, now local roads managed by the local highway authorities, include the A428 (Cambridge-Coventry) running east–west through Bedford Borough, and the A6 from Luton to Carlisle.

Railways
Three of England's main lines pass through Bedfordshire:

There are London North Western rural services also running between Bedford and  along the Marston Vale Line.

Waterways
The River Great Ouse links Bedfordshire to the Fenland waterways. As of 2004 there are plans by the Bedford & Milton Keynes Waterway Trust to construct a canal linking the Great Ouse at Bedford to the Grand Union Canal at Milton Keynes, 14 miles (23 km) distant.

Air
Luton Airport (the fifth busiest in the United Kingdom) has flights to many UK, European, Middle Eastern and North African destinations, operated largely (but not exclusively) by low-cost airlines.

Television
Local news is provided by BBC East and ITV Anglia from Cambridge, southern part of the county such as Luton will also receive BBC London & ITV London meaning the area can get news and television programs from Cambridge and London.

Settlements

Education
The state education system for all of Bedfordshire used to be organised by Bedfordshire County Council. Unlike most of the United Kingdom, Bedfordshire County Council operated a three-tier education system arranged into lower, middle and upper schools, as recommended in the Plowden Report of 1967, although Luton continued to operate a two-tier system. The three-tier arrangement continued in the rest of the county, though in 2006 a vote was held with a view to moving to the two-tier model, but this was rejected.

After the 2009 structural changes to local government in England, Bedfordshire County Council was abolished, and its responsibilities for education were passed to Bedford Borough Council and Central Bedfordshire Council.

Bedford Borough
Bedford Borough Council voted in November 2009 to change to the two-tier model in its area. The change was due to be introduced over a five-year period and be completed in 2015. However, with the cancellation of the Building Schools for the Future programme in 2010, the borough changed its proposals, and the switch proceeded on school by school basis where council funds allowed. However as of 2020 all of Bedford Borough has a two-tier education structure apart from in the Marston Vale area (one upper school remains).

Most of the secondary schools in the area offer sixth form courses (such as A Levels), though Bedford College and The Bedford Sixth Form also offer a range of further education courses. Additionally, Stella Mann College is a private college which offers a range of further education courses relating to the performing arts.

There are a number of independent schools, many of which have links to the Harpur Trust. These include Bedford School, Bedford Modern School and Bedford Girls' School.

Central Bedfordshire
In Central Bedfordshire, the school systems in Dunstable and Sandy have been re-organised into the two-tier model in response to parent and school demand, but elsewhere in the authority the three-tier model continues. Plans for the construction of new settlements in Marston Vale have included lower, middle and upper schools.

As well as sixth form departments in schools, the main further education providers in the district are Central Bedfordshire College and Shuttleworth College

Luton
Luton also operates a three-tier education system, though its organisation of infant, junior and high schools mirrors the traditional transfer age into secondary education of 11 years. However, most of Luton's high schools do not offer sixth-form education. Instead, this is handled by Luton Sixth Form College, though Barnfield College and Cardinal Newman Catholic School also offer a range of further education courses.

Higher education
There are two universities based in the county – the University of Bedfordshire and Cranfield University. These institutions attract students from all over the UK and abroad, as well as from Bedfordshire.

Landmarks

Cardington airship sheds 
The enormous Cardington airship sheds are situated to the south of Bedford, near the villages of Cardington and Shortstown.  They were originally built for the construction of large airships during WW1.  Since falling out of their intended use, one has been used for many purposes including housing film sets for 'Charlie and the Chocolate Factory' and 'Batman Begins' and as a rehearsal space for Take That, with the other having been extensively refurbished and now accommodating Hybrid Air Vehicles, a British modern airship design and manufacturing company.

St Paul's Church Bedford 
St Paul's Church, Bedford is a Church of England parish church and the Civic Church of the Borough of Bedford and the County of Bedfordshire. Located on St Paul's Square, the large medieval and later church of cathedral proportions and iconic spire dominates the town and area, exercises a ministry of welcome to thousands of visitors and pilgrims from far and wide each year, and is a focus for special commemorations and celebrations in the borough, county, region and wider community, as well as being a central venue for concerts, recitals and exhibitions. Historically, St Paul's played a key part in the life of the British nation during the Second World War as the church of the BBC.

Millbrook Proving Ground 
The Millbrook Proving Ground, near Junction 13 of the M1, has  of varied vehicle test tracks.

Sport and leisure

Bedfordshire is home to Luton Town F.C. and the Ampthill RUFC and Bedford Blues rugby teams, amongst other various sporting teams.

Bedfordshire boasts a 40-mile (64  km) walk traversing the county from Leighton Buzzard at the southern endpoint and Sandy, Bedfordshire/Gamlingay in southern Cambridgeshire to the east; this is called the Greensand Ridge Walk. For cyclists, there is a parallel route called the Greensand Cycle Way that follows minor country roads.

Bibliographical references
 Bedfordshire Magazine (quarterly)
 Elstow Moot Hall leaflets on John Bunyan and 17th century subjects
 Guide to the Bedfordshire Record Office 1957 with supplements.
 Guide to the Russell Estate Collections Published in 1966.
 Conisbe, L. R. (1962) A Bedfordshire Bibliography (supplement, 1967)
 Dony, John (1953) A Bedfordshire Flora. Luton: Corporation of Luton Museum & Art Gallery
 Dony, John (1942) A History of the Straw Hat Industry. Luton: Gibbs, Bamforth & Co.
 Freeman, Charles (1958) Pillow Lace in the East Midlands. Luton: Luton Museum and Art Gallery
 Godber, Joyce (1969) History of Bedfordshire 1066–1888
 White, H. O. Bedfordshire Historical Record Society (published annually)

See also

 Lord Lieutenant of Bedfordshire
 High Sheriff of Bedfordshire
 Healthcare in Bedfordshire

References

External links

 North Beds Online Local Information for North Bedfordshire

 Images of Bedfordshire at the English Heritage Archive
 Swiss Garden, Old Warden Swiss Garden, Old Warden - part of the Shuttleworth estate

 
Ceremonial counties of England
Former non-metropolitan counties
Counties of England established in antiquity